The Townsend Thunderbird is a homebuilt design created by the experienced cropduster Gid Townsend and built in 1956 with assistance of Curtis Pitts.

Design
The Thunderbird is powered by a  Jacobs radial engine with a constant speed propeller. The horizontal stabilizer and aluminum wings are the outer panels of a Vultee BT-13 trainer. The engine cowl is from a Cessna UC-78. The fuselage is welded tubing with fabric covering. The landing gear is from a Cessna 180.

Operational history
By 1974 the prototype was unflyable. The aircraft was later metalized, the turtledeck was removed, and it was converted to use a Wright R-975 radial engine.

Specifications (Townsend Thunderbird)

References

External links
 

Homebuilt aircraft